Arthur James Williams III is a former Democratic member of the North Carolina General Assembly representing the state's sixth House district, including constituents in Beaufort and Pitt counties. Williams is a retiree from Washington, North Carolina.

Willams served in the United States Air Force from 1959 to 1963. In 1960, he was an Airman Third Class stationed at Amarillo Air Force Base, Texas.

References

External links

Year of birth missing (living people)
Living people
Place of birth missing (living people)
Members of the North Carolina House of Representatives
North Carolina Democrats
North Carolina Republicans
People from Washington, North Carolina
United States Air Force airmen
21st-century American politicians